"Son of man", "son of Adam",  or "like a man", are phrases used in the Hebrew Bible, various apocalyptic works of the intertestamental period, and in the Greek New Testament. In the indefinite form ("son of Adam", "son of man", "like a man") used in the Hebrew Bible it is a form of address, or it contrasts human beings against God and the angels, or contrasts foreign nations (like Persia and Babylon), which are often represented as animals in apocalyptic writings (bear, goat, or ram), with Israel which is represented as human (a "son of man"), or it signifies an eschatological human figure.

The phrase is used in its indefinite form in the Greek Old Testament, Biblical apocrypha and Pseudepigrapha. The Greek New Testament uses the earlier indefinite form while introducing a novel definite form, "the son of man."

History

Jewish Bible

The Hebrew expression "son of man" appears 107 times in the Hebrew Bible, the majority (93 times) in the Book of Ezekiel. It is used in three main ways: as a form of address (Ezekiel); to contrast the lowly status of humanity against the permanence and exalted dignity of God and the angels; and as a future eschatological figure whose coming will signal the end of history and the time of God's judgment.

Daniel 7 tells of a vision given to Daniel in which four "beasts," representing pagan nations, oppress the people of Israel until judged by God.  describes how the "Ancient of Days" (God) gives dominion over the earth to "one like a son of man ( [])". The passage in Daniel 7:13 occurs in Biblical Aramaic.

Later in chapter 7 it is explained that "one like a man" certainly implies a "human being" and also stands for "the saints of the Most High" (7:18, 21–22) and "the people of the saints of the Most High" (7:27). The "saints" and "people of the saints" in turn probably stand for the people of Israel – the author is expressing the hope that God will take dominion over the world away from the beast-like pagan "nations" and give it to human-like Israel.

Apocrypha and Pseudepigrapha
Although Daniel's 7:13 "like a son of man" has been interpreted as standing for the Messiah (e.g. in Rashi's Commentary on the Tanakh), this interpretation was probably introduced by later apocryphal and deuterocanonical works such as the Similitudes (or Parables) of Enoch and 4 Ezra. Whether these messianic "Son of Man" references are genuinely Jewish or the result of Christian interpolation is disputed. An example of a disputed section is that of The Similitudes (1 Enoch 37–71) which uses Daniel 7 to produce an unparalleled messianic Son of Man, pre-existent and hidden yet ultimately revealed, functioning as judge, vindicator of righteousness, and universal ruler.

New Testament

The gospels introduce a new definite form, literally 'the son of the man,'  an awkward and ambiguous expression in Greek. It functions as an emphatic equivalent of the first-person pronoun I/me/my, and in all four gospels it is used only by Jesus (except once in the Gospel of John, when the crowd asks what Jesus means by it). German theologian Rudolf Bultmann sees the phrase not as one genuinely used by Jesus but as one inserted by the early Church, but theologian C. F. D. Moule argues that the phrase, "so far from being a title evolved from current apocalyptic thought by the early Church and put by it onto the lips of Jesus, is among the most important symbols used by Jesus himself to describe his vocation and that of those whom he summoned to be with him."

The term in the source languages 
The exact words used for "son of man" vary, depending on the source language.

 — see Son of man (Judaism)
 – per the Septuagint in Dan. 7:13 [LXX].
 – per the New Testament, see Son of man (Christianity)

See also
 Son of man (Christianity)
 Son of man (Judaism)

Footnotes

References

External links
Jewish Encyclopedia: Son of Man
Is the Lord Jesus the Son of God? 
Catholic Encyclopedia: Son of Man

Biblical phrases
Judaism-related controversies
Judeo-Christian topics
Book of Daniel
Judaism in the New Testament
Christian terminology